Hokkien kinship system is the kinship system for Hokkien language users.

Common Hokkien family and terminology

Members of the nuclear family

Hokkien-language phrases
Kinship terminology